The Daylight Award is awarded every second year since 2016 "to honor and support daylight research and daylight in architecture, for the benefit of human health, well-being and the environment. The award puts specific emphasis on the interrelation between theory and practice".

The Daylight Award for Research "is awarded to individuals or smaller groups of scientists who have distinguished themselves as outstanding contributors to internationally recognized daylight research. It acknowledges highly original and influential advances in the areas of natural science, human science or social science, with special emphasis on the effects of daylight on human health, well-being and performance".

The Daylight Award for Architecture "is awarded to one or more architects or other professionals who have distinguished themselves by realizing architecture or creating urban environments that showcase unique use of daylight. Special emphasis will be put on architecture that considers the overall quality of life, its impact on human health, well-being and performance, and its value to society".

Each award is given as a personal prize, and each to the sum of €100,000. The award winners will be involved in such activities as lectures and master classes following the award ceremony.

The Daylight Award is presented by the non-profit, private charitable foundations, VILLUM FONDEN, VELUX FONDEN and VELUX STIFTUNG, established by Villum Kann Rasmussen.

History 
The three foundations behind The Daylight Award have a long history when it comes to awarding best practice in daylight. Since 1980, they have awarded daylight prizes to, among others, Jørn Utzon (DK) (1980), Henning Larsen (DK) (1987), Bob Gysin (CH) (2007), Richard Perez (USA) (2008), Peter Zumthor (CH) (2010), James Carpenter (USA) (2010), Lacaton & Vassal (F) (2011), Gigon & Guyer (CH) (2012) and SANAA (JP) (2014).

In 2016 The Daylight Award for Research was awarded to professor at Ecole Polytechnique Fédérale de Lausanne (EPFL), Marilyne Andersen, and architect Steven Holl, Steven Holl Architects, New York and Beijing, was awarded The Daylight Award for Architecture. The awards were presented and celebrated at a formal ceremony in Copenhagen, Denmark, at Ny Carlsberg Glyptotek on November 2, 2016.

In 2018, The Daylight Award for Architecture was given to Hiroshi Sambuichi, and The Daylight Award for Research to Greg Ward, the creator of the Radiance simulation tool that underpins the field of daylighting research and practice.

In 2020 The Daylight Award for Architecture was given to architect and designer Juha Leiviskä, Finland, for his works of architecture that demonstrate a unique ability to make daylight an integral element of his buildings. Russell Foster, neuroscientist from United Kingdom, was awarded in category Daylight Research, for his clinical studies in humans addressing important questions regarding light. Architectural academic, photographer and writer Henry Plummer, United States, received the award for lifetime achievement, for recording daylight phenomena in his extensive photography and writing.

In 2022 The Daylight Award for daylight in architecture was given to Yvonne Farrell and Shelley McNamara from Grafton Architects. Grafton Architects have mastered the use of daylight throughout their wide and exceptionally varied design production. Daylight is employed in their design process as an integrated and irreplaceable quality, along with the spatial arrangement, structural frame, and technical systems.
The Daylight Award for daylight research was given to Anna Wirz-Justice, neurobiologist and Professor Emerita of Psychiatric Neurobiology at the University of Basel, and former Head of the Centre for Chronobiology at the Psychiatric University Clinic in Basel. Anna Wirz-Justice has undertaken pioneering research on how human circadian rhythms and sleep are regulated by light. Defining the key parameters of how light acts as a biological stimulus, including the importance of when we see light, how long we see it, and of what intensity and color spectrum.

References 

Architecture awards